Pycnarmon aeriferalis is a moth in the family Crambidae. It was described by Frederic Moore in 1877. It is found in India (Sikkim, Andamans) and Taiwan.

The wingspan is about 22 mm. Adults are ochreous with black spots. The antemedial line on the forewings is brown and curved and the postmedial line is blackish, straight from the costa to the submarginal black spot. There is an apical black speck. The hindwings have black postmedial lines and there is submarginal spot.

References

Spilomelinae
Moths described in 1877
Moths of Asia
Moths of Taiwan